Canda is a comune (municipality) in the Province of Rovigo in the Italian region Veneto, located about 80 km southwest of Venice and about  west of Rovigo.

The municipality of Canda contains the frazioni (subdivisions, mainly villages and hamlets) La Chiavica and Le Campagnole.

Canda borders the following municipalities: Badia Polesine, Bagnolo di Po, Castelguglielmo, Lendinara, Trecenta.

Demographic evolution

References

Cities and towns in Veneto